Boogie Box High is an English pop supergroup formed musical project headed by Andros Georgiou in the late 1980s that featured a range of collaborators, including Georgiou's second cousin George Michael, guitarist Nick Heyward (of Haircut One Hundred), keyboardist Mick Talbot (of The Style Council), guitarist–songwriter David Austin, bassist Deon Estus, and others.

Overview
Boogie Box High's first single was a cover version of "Jive Talkin'"; released in July 1987 and was originally a top ten hit for the Bee Gees in 1975. The cover reached number 7 on the UK Singles Chart.

Outrageous, Boogie Box High's only LP, was released in 1989. It was released in the United States via SBK Records. The album included the previous two singles, "Jive Talkin'" and "Gave It All Away", as well as a new released titled "Nervous". The latter single failed to garner any chart success.

Michael's contributions to the album were two previously unreleased songs he had written for Wham!'s debut album Fantastic, "Golden Soul" and "Soul Boy". David Austin sang the lead vocal for the single "Gave It All Away". Once again, Michael was not credited for any of this.

Discography

Albums
 Outrageous (1989)

Singles

References

External links
 Boogie Box High at Discogs

1987 establishments in England
2010 disestablishments in England
2023 establishments in England
English pop music groups
Pop music supergroups
British supergroups
Musical groups from London
Musical groups established in 1987
Musical groups disestablished in 2010
Musical groups reestablished in 2023